Mioawateria bigranulosa is a species of sea snail, a marine gastropod mollusk in the family Raphitomidae.

Description

Distribution
This marine species occurs off Japan

References

 Okutani, Takashi. "Report of the archibenthal and abyssal Mollusca mainly collected from Sagami Bay and adjacent waters by the RV Soyo-Maru during the year 1955-1963." Jour. Fac. Sci., Univ. Tokyo, Sec. 2 (1964): 371-447.

External links
 

bigranulosa
Gastropods described in 1964